is a city in Iburi Subprefecture, Hokkaido, Japan. Part of Shikotsu-Toya National Park, it is southwest of Sapporo, west of Tomakomai and northeast of Hakodate.

As of September 2016, the city has an estimated population of 49,523 and a population density of 230 persons per km2. The total area is 212.11 km2.
The city office is in Horobetsu. The town of Noboribetsu is at the mouth of the Noboribetsu river and is therefore a much narrower area.

Geography
The mountains dominate the west and north while the plains dominate around five km within the coastline. There are three towns along the Pacific Ocean: from northeast to southwest, Noboribetsu, Horobetsu and Washibetsu. These betsu are derived from "river" in the Ainu language. Noboribetsu is on the Noboribetsu River. Horobetsu and Washibetsu are on the Iburi-horobetsu River and the Washibetsu River respectively.

Origin of name
The name, Noboribetsu, derives from an Ainu word, nupur-pet, which means dark-colored river; the kanji , meaning "climbing different", are used for their phonetic value only, and have no relation to the original meaning.

Climate

History
1919: Horobetsu village was founded.
1951: Horobetsu village became Horobetsu town.
1961: Horobetsu town renamed to Noboribetsu town.
1970: Noboribetsu town became Noboribetsu city.

Education

High school
 Hokkaido Noboribetsu Seiryo High School (登別市立西陵中学校)

Secondary school
 Hokkaido Noboribetsu Akebi Secondary School (北海道登別明日中等教育学校)

Transportation
Muroran Main Line: Washibetsu – Horobetsu – Tomiura – Noboribetsu
Hokkaido Expressway: Noboribetsu-Muroran IC – Tomiura PA – Noboribetsu-Higashi IC
Route 36

Sightseeing

The town has a range of onsen for bathing as well as other hot springs formed from different minerals for scenic viewing, and is also known for its bear park. Noboribetsu-onsen is one of many well-known resorts in Japan, with many hotels and ryokan, and is the largest "hot spring town" in Hokkaido.

Twin cities

International
 Faaborg-Midtfyn Municipality, Denmark
 Saipan, United States
 Guangzhou, Guangdong, China

Domestic
 Shiroishi, Miyagi
 Ebina, Kanagawa

Notable people from Noboribetsu
 Yoshida Brothers, Japanese shamisenist musicians
 Masayuki Kono, Japanese professional wrestler and former mixed martial artist
 Takashi Narita, former volleyball player
 Toma Ikuta, Japanese actor (Hanazakari no Kimitachi e, Honey & Clover, Sensei!, Ouroboros, Hanamizuki and Ningen Shikkaku)
 Rina Sumioka, Japanese female singer-songwriter and J-pop idol
 Yukie Chiri, Ainu transcriber and translator of Yukar (Ainu epic tales)
 Kazuki Kushibiki, Japanese football player
 Samizu Matsuki, artist, classical realism painting, drawing, emigre.

References

External links 

Official Website 
noboribetsu-spa 

Cities in Hokkaido
Spa towns in Japan